Washington Township is a township in Anderson County, Kansas, United States. As of the 2010 census, its population was 272.

History
Washington Township was established in 1857.

Geography
According to the USGS, it contains five cemeteries: Baptist, Horn, Hyatt, Mont Ida and Springfield.

The streams of Bradshaw Creek and Skunk Branch run through this township.

References
 USGS Geographic Names Information System (GNIS)

External links
 US-Counties.com
 City-Data.com

Townships in Anderson County, Kansas
Townships in Kansas
1857 establishments in Kansas Territory